Allophylus decipiens (E.Mey.) Radlk., commonly known as the bastard taaibos, is a multi- or single-stemmed, small, evergreen tree about 3–4 m in height occurring in coastal forest, fringe forest and thickets, and wooded ravines and streams. Found up to 800 m in the southern coastal regions of the Cape Province, KwaZulu-Natal, Eswatini, along the escarpment forest of Mpumalanga, including Soutpansberg and in Mozambique. There are some 219 species in the genus of Allophylus.

It has a pale grey bark and glabrous, trifoliolate leaves, which may be deeply to shallow lobed. Its fragrant flowers are small and whitish in clusters of three in dense axillary racemes up to 6 cm, or in 2-3 branched panicles, the fertile flowers being few in a panicle, otherwise male. Sepals greenish-white glabrous, petals as long as the sepals, fringed; stamens longer, filaments hairy at the base. Fruit of 2 cocci or 1 by abortion. Fruit is near-spherical and some 6 mm in diameter, maturing to bright red. Wood white, close-grained and hard.

References

External links
SANBI distribution map
'The Nomenclature of Allophylus species in South Africa' - B. de Winter

decipiens